Ben Frost (born 1980) is an Australian-Icelandic musician, composer, record producer, sound designer, and director.

Life 
Born in Melbourne, Australia, and based in Reykjavík, Iceland, since 2005, Frost composes minimalist, instrumental, and experimental music, with influences ranging from classical minimalism to punk rock and black metal.

His early releases include the guitar-oriented albums Steel Wound (2003) and School of Emotional Engineering (as part of the band School of Emotional Engineering) (2004). Theory of Machines (2007) marked a radical shift toward more angular aggressive music and was further advanced on the critically acclaimed By The Throat (2009). In 2011, commissioned by Unsound Festival, and as part of a collaboration with Brian Eno and fellow Icelandic composer Daníel Bjarnason, Frost released Solaris, a conceptual album which rescored Andrei Tarkovsky's film of the same name. In 2014 after signing with British record label Mute Records, Frost released the critically lauded and distinctly more rhythmical album Aurora. In 2017 Frost traveled to Chicago to record The Centre Cannot Hold with Steve Albini. In addition to his studio albums, Frost has collaborated with contemporary dance companies Chunky Move, the Icelandic Dance Company and the British choreographer Wayne McGregor. He composed the music for Wayne McGregor's 2010 production FAR.

Alongside his solo work, Frost has collaborated often with other musicians, including composer Nico Muhly, Valgeir Sigurðsson, Björk, Tim Hecker, Colin Stetson, Daníel Bjarnason, and American rock band Swans, commonly contributing to albums as a producer, studio engineer, and performer.

Frost co-composed Music for Solaris with Daníel Bjarnason, which was inspired by both Stanisław Lem's novel Solaris and the 1972 Tarkovsky film of the same name. It was performed by Frost, Bjarnason, and Sinfonietta Cracovia. He composed the music for the films Sleeping Beauty, the Icelandic drama The Deep, and the 2015 British television series Fortitude. In 2012, he traveled to the Democratic Republic of Congo with Richard Mosse, along with Trevor Tweeten to score the sound for Mosse's artwork The Enclave.

In 2013, in his first directorial role, he premiered a critically acclaimed music-theatre adaptation of the Iain Banks novel The Wasp Factory.

In 2015, Frost, in collaboration with Paul Haslinger, created the score for Tom Clancy's Rainbow Six Siege.

Two years later, in 2017, Frost scored the film Super Dark Times. In that same year, he premiered a new installation, titled Incoming, with Richard Mosse and Trevor Tweeten at the Barbican Centre in London, now touring worldwide.

Frost participated in the recording of Swans''' 2019 album Leaving Meaning and joined their touring band.

From 2017 to 2020, Frost created the score for all three seasons of Netflix's German sci-fi thriller Dark. Music for film and television Sleeping Beauty – Directed by Julia Leigh
 Super Dark Times  – Directed by Kevin PhillipsFortitude – Directed by Kieron HawkesDark – Directed by Baran Bo OdarRaised By Wolves  – Directed by Ridley ScottWhat Remains – Directed by Ran Huang1899 – Directed by Baran Bo Odar

 Opera 

 The Wasp Factory (2013)
 The Murder of Halit Yozgat (2020)

Discography
 Music for Sad Children (2001) – independent
 Steel Wound (2003/re-issue 2007/2012) – Room40
 School of Emotional Engineering (2004) – Architecture
 Theory of Machines (2007) – Bedroom Community
 By the Throat (2009) – Bedroom Community
 The Invisibles (2010) – for Amnesty International
 Sólaris (with Daníel Bjarnason) (2011) – Bedroom Community
 Sleeping Beauty (2011) – independent – soundtrack for Julia Leigh's movie of the same name.
 Black Marrow (2013) – independent
 FAR (2013) – independent
 Aurora (2014) – Mute Records / Bedroom Community
 Variant (2014) – Bedroom Community
Tom Clancy's Siege (Original Game Soundtrack) (with Paul Haslinger) (2015) – Ubisoft Music
 The Wasp Factory (2016) – Bedroom Community
 Threshold of Faith (2017) – Mute Records
 Catastrophic Deliquescence, Music From Fortitude (2015-2018) – Mute Records – soundtrack for Fortitude (TV series)
 The Centre Cannot Hold (2017) – Mute Records
 Super Dark Times (2017) – Super Dark Times Soundtrack – soundtrack for Kevin Phillips's film of the same name
 Dark – Netflix series Dark Cycle 1 Soundtrack (2019)  – Invada Records
 Dark – Netflix series Dark Cycle 2 Soundtrack (2019) – Invada Records
 Dark – Netflix series Dark Cycle 3 Soundtrack (2020) – Invada Records
 Broken Spectre –'' Vinyl Factory

See also 
List of ambient music artists

References

External links

Ben Frost - Credits - AllMusic
 

1980 births
Living people
Australian male composers
Australian composers
Australian expatriates in Iceland
Musicians from Melbourne
Mute Records artists
Australian experimental musicians
Australian electronic musicians